Roger Nicolet (18 December 1931 – 18 January 2020) was a Belgian engineer. He oversaw several major building projects, including Place Bonaventure, Le Village Olympique, Place Montreal Trust, Royal Bank Plaza, the CN Tower, King Abdulaziz University, the Louvre Pyramid, and the Tehran International Tower. He was an Officer of the National Order of Quebec.

References

1931 births
2020 deaths
20th-century Belgian engineers
21st-century Belgian engineers
Belgian civil engineers
Officers of the National Order of Quebec